Measurement dysfunction describes a situation or behavior where actual data metrics, statistics and especially their meaning (or communicated meaning), can become problematic due to misuse. Specifically, in areas such as Human Resources (Performance measurements), Technology (Safety), Finance or Health, measurement dysfunctionality are critical, as it can lead to negative outcomes, wrong predictions or forecasts.

Practices to avoid:

 Reward of wrong behavior (also persons who manipulate)
 Measuring the wrong things
 Measuring either not enough or too much
 Cheating or data manipulation (intentional or unintentional due to wrong calculation models, systematic errors, human errors, etc.)
On eliminating dysfunctional measurement:

 Establish, and monitor the move to and adherence to ‘policies’ for good, functional measurement
 Support technical correctness
 Periodically evaluate the information need and value delivered by measurements

Trivia 
"What gets measured gets manipulated."

See also 
 Measurement uncertainty
 Leadership
 Performance measurement
 Plagiarism
 OKR
 Corporate culture
 Verification and validation
Scientific rigor

References 

Measurement